"I Have Dreamed" is a show tune from the 1951 Rodgers and Hammerstein musical, The King and I. In the original Broadway production it was sung by Doretta Morrow and Larry Douglas. It has since become a standard, with many artists recording the song.

Background
In the show, the characters of Lun Tha and Tuptim sing of how they have dreamt of their true love blossoming in freedom, as they prepare to escape from the King's palace. This is in contrast to the subdued mood of the song "We Kiss in a Shadow", when they fear that the  King will learn of their love.

"I Have Dreamed" was added to the score of The King and I during its out-of-town tryout run. The song was recorded for the soundtrack of the 1956 film version of The King and I, but, ultimately, no footage was shot to feature it. Only the melody is heard in the film, as incidental music prior to the "We Kiss in a Shadow" sequence. However, "I Have Dreamed" was retained on the soundtrack album where it was sung by Reuben Fuentes and Leona Gordon.

Controversy
The tune has been accused of similarities to Alfred Newman's track, "The Hill of the Brilliant Green Jade", from the 1944 film The Keys of the Kingdom starring Gregory Peck, though only seven notes are the same.

Recorded versions
Ronnie Aldrich
Thomas Allen
Julie Andrews (1994) - Broadway: The Music of Richard Rodgers
June Angela and Martin Vidnovic for the 1977 Broadway revival recording of The King and I
Jane Ira Bloom (2005) - Like Silver, Like Song
Boston Pops Orchestra
Peabo Bryson with Lea Salonga (1992) for the 1992 Hollywood Bowl studio cast recording of The King and I
David Burnham with Tracy Venner Warren (1999) for the 1999 Richard Rich studio animation of The King and I
Chad & Jeremy had a (Billboard Hot 100 hit in 1965, where it peaked at #91, and #22 on the Easy Listening chart; Billboard said of it that "the Rodgers-Hammerstein tune is beautifully revived with this smooth vocal with strong dance beat backing.")
Donna Cruz
Bill Cunliffe
Bobby Darin
Sammy Davis Jr.
Doris Day (Richard Rodgers identified hers as the most beautiful rendition he had ever heard)
Trudy Desmond
Kurt Elling
Connie Evingson
Sergio Franchi covered this song on his 1964 RCA Victor album The Exciting Voice of Sergio Franchi
Connie Francis
David Friesen
Wilbur Harden
Fred Hersch
Lena Horne
Betty Johnson
Dick Johnson
Tom Jones
Lainie Kazan recorded for her 1967 album The Love Album on MGM Records
Andre Kostelanetz
Nancy Lamott
Julius LaRosa
The Lettermen
Keith Lockhart
London Philharmonic Orchestra
Jason Manford on his 2017 album A Different Stage
Mantovani
Johnny Mathis
Howard McGillin
Dave McKenna
Helen Merrill
Glenn Miller Orchestra
Patina Miller
Matt Monro
Doretta Morrow with Larry Douglas for the original Broadway cast recording
Patrice Munsel
Kelli O'Hara
Greg Phillinganes
Herb Pomeroy
Royal Philharmonic Orchestra
"Little" Jimmy Scott (recorded 1972)
Jeanette Scovotti
Doc Severinsen
Marc Shaiman - arranged for the film The American President
Cybill Shepherd
David Silverman
Kaz Simmons – Take Me Home (2005)
Frank Sinatra - The Concert Sinatra (1963)
Barbra Streisand- recorded in 1985 as part of a King and I medley that incorporates elements of “We Kiss In a Shadow” and concludes with “Something Wonderful.”
Bryn Terfel (1996) - Something Wonderful: Bryn Terfel sings Rodgers and Hammerstein
Scott Walker
Gerald Wiggins
Andy Williams
 Matthew Morrison and Laura Michelle Kelly

References

Songs about dreams
1951 songs
1969 singles
Songs with music by Richard Rodgers
Songs with lyrics by Oscar Hammerstein II
Barbra Streisand songs
Chad & Jeremy songs
The Lettermen songs
Scott Walker (singer) songs
Andy Williams songs
Songs from The King and I
Capitol Records singles
Columbia Records singles